Adela homalella is a moth of the  family Adelidae. It is found in Spain, Austria, Bosnia and Herzegovina, Serbia and Montenegro, Albania and the Republic of Macedonia.

References

Moths described in 1859
Adelidae
Moths of Europe